Fabian Aupperle (born 16 February 1986) is a German footballer who plays for German lower league side FC Erding.

External links

1986 births
Living people
German footballers
VfB Stuttgart II players
1. FC Heidenheim players
SV Wacker Burghausen players
SG Sonnenhof Großaspach players
TSG 1899 Hoffenheim II players
3. Liga players
Association football defenders
People from Backnang
Sportspeople from Stuttgart (region)
Footballers from Baden-Württemberg